Raxaul Airport  is an airport located at Raxaul in the state of Bihar, India. It was established after the Sino-Indian War of 1962, when it served as an emergency landing ground for the Indian Army. The Airports Authority of India (AAI) that owns the airport has undertaken a pre-feasibility study at the airport  to upgrade the airport to handle ATR-72 aircraft. A draft Master Plan highlighting a requirement of an additional 121 acres of land has been submitted to the State Government. There have been recent proposals to expand the airport.

References

 Raxaul Airport at Airports Authority of India

External links
 

Airports in Bihar
East Champaran district
Transport in Raxaul
Airports established in 1962
1962 establishments in Bihar
20th-century architecture in India